Fjergen is a lake in the municipality of Meråker in Trøndelag county, Norway. The  lake has a hydropower dam on the southern end which flows out into the Kåpperåa river which is part of the Stjørdalselva river system.

The lakes Feren and Funnsjøen lie several kilometers to the northwest, and the border with Sweden lies a few kilometers to the east.

See also
List of lakes in Norway

References

Lakes of Trøndelag
Meråker
Reservoirs in Norway